David Miller (born April 14, 1973) is an American tenor. Since 2004, he has been a member of the successful classical crossover group Il Divo, who have sold over 30 million copies worldwide. As well, Miller shared a Tony Award with the other members of the ensemble cast of Baz Luhrmann's 2002 revival of La bohème in 2003.

Background and personal life 
Miller was born in San Diego, California, but raised in the suburbs of Denver, Colorado. As a student at Heritage High School in Littleton, he starred in high school productions as the Rooster in Annie and Noah in Two by Two. He was also a member of the Colorado Children's Chorale but only took music seriously in high school after being asked to audition for Annie due to the lack of male cast members with the ability to sing. Uninterested in his father's suggestion that he join the military, he went on to Oberlin Conservatory of Music, where he studied with Richard Miller, and graduated in 1995 with a bachelor's degree in Vocal Performance and a master's degree in Opera Theatre.

Miller has been married to soprano Sarah Joy Miller, a member of the Three Graces, since 2009. They live in New York's financial district with their dog, Cosmo, a Maltese-Havanese mix.

Musical career

Opera 
Miller was a member of the Pittsburgh Opera Center in 1996–7.  He first came to attention after his highly acclaimed Washington Opera debut in March 1997 as Alfredo in Giuseppe Verdi's La traviata.

On May 6, 1998, he performed, along with other opera singers, for President Bill Clinton in the White House.

In 1999, he appeared with the Los Angeles Opera in the role of Tybalt in Thor Steingraber's production of I Capuleti e i Montecchi by Vincenzo Bellini.  He reprised this role at the Teatro Municipal in Santiago de Chile, and at the Savonlinna Festival in Finland.

In 2000, he made his debut with Opera Australia and at Teatro alla Scala in Milan, singing Tony in West Side Story. In 2003, he sang with the Los Angeles Philharmonic and Audra McDonald at the Hollywood Bowl in excerpts from West Side Story.

Miller made his debut in the Vlaamse Opera as Cassio in 2001 and 2002. In addition he performed in Jules Massenet's Manon in Teatro Verdi in Trieste under the baton of Daniel Oren. In the US, he sang the title role in Offenbach's The Tales of Hoffmann at the now-defunct Connecticut Opera in Hartford, Connecticut. He also interpreted the role of Percy in Donizetti's Anne Boleyn at Pittsburgh Opera with John Mauceri during 2000/2001.  During the 2002/2003 season he performed in the world premiere of the opera Vita by Marco Tutino at Teatro alla Scala in Milan. He has worked with American opera companies in several roles, including Des Grieux in Manon, Romeo in Romeo et Juliette, Werther, Alfredo in La Traviata and Tamino in The Magic Flute with Opera Pacific.

His best known work to date is considered to be his role as Rodolfo in Baz Luhrmann's 2002 version of Puccini's La Boheme. This show modernized the opera in an effort to lure young audiences to Broadway. Luhrmann staged a Broadway show as he did with Moulin Rouge! and his Romeo et Juliette. Luhrmann's version of La bohème premiered in Sydney ten years before it debuted on Broadway.  David was one of 3 Rodolfos in the original Broadway cast and shared Tony Award with the other members of the ensemble cast of Baz Luhrmann's 2002 revival of La bohème in 2003.

Outside of Il Divo he has also taken roles such as Don Ottavio in Mozart's Don Giovanni, Belmonte in Abduction from the Seraglio and Tom Rakewell in The Rake's Progress.

In December 2007, while Il Divo was taking a break from their world tour, David made a return to the classical opera stage.  He performed in recital with the Chicago Pops Orchestra, singing a variety of tenor arias as well as some show tunes and Christmas favorites.

Il Divo 

In December 2003, he became a member of the international musical quartet Il Divo along with Swiss operatic tenor Urs Bühler, French pop singer Sébastien Izambard, and Spanish baritone Carlos Marín.  Their eponymous first album became a worldwide multiplatinum-selling record when released in November 2004, entering Billboard at number four and selling five million copies worldwide in less than a year, knocking Robbie Williams from the number one spot in the charts. Their second album, Ancora, was released on November 7, 2005, in the United Kingdom. Il Divo's third album, Siempre, was released on November 21, 2006, in the United States and on November 27, 2006, internationally. Their next album, The Promise, was released on November 10, 2008 (internationally) and on November 17, 2008 (in Canada & the US), and shot straight to number 1 in the UK.

Discography

Opera 
Baz Luhrmann's La Bohème – Highlights from the 2002 Original Broadway Cast

Il Divo 

Studio album:
2004 – Il Divo
2005 – Ancora
2006 – Siempre
2008 – The Promise
2011 – Wicked Game
2013 – A Musical Affair
2015 – Amor & Pasión
2018 – Timeless

Seasonal album
2005 – The Christmas Collection

Compilations:
2012 –  The Greatest Hits

Live Album:
2009 –  An Evening with Il Divo: Live in Barcelona
2014 –  Live in Japan

Special Editions:
2005 –  Il Divo. Gift Edition 
2006 –  Il Divo Collezione
2006 –  Christmas Collection. The Yule Log
2008 –  The Promise. Luxury Edition
2011 –  Wicked Game. Gift Edition
2011 –  Wicked Game. Limited Edition Deluxe Box Set
2012 –  The Greatest Hits. Gift Edition
2012 –  The Greatest Hits. Deluxe Limited Edition
2014 –  A Musical Affair. Exclusive Gift Edition
2014 –  A Musical Affair. French Versión
2014 –  Live in Japan. Japan Versión

Videography

Il Divo 
 2004 – Live at Gotham Hall
 2005 – Encore
 2005 – Mamá
 2006 – The Yule Log: The Christmas Collection 
 2006 – Live At the Greek Theater
 2008 – At the Coliseum
 2009 – An Evening with Il Divo: Live in Barcelona
 2011 – Live in London
 2014 – Live in Japan

References

External links 

 DivoDavid.com - official website
 Il Divo - official website

 4 Ever Il Divo Fanclub Belgium

1973 births
American male singers
American male pop singers
American tenors
Living people
Opera crossover singers
People from Littleton, Colorado
Musicians from San Diego
Oberlin Conservatory of Music alumni
Singers from California
Il Divo members
21st-century American singers